The Hornsby Rugby Union Football Club is a rugby union team from Hornsby in Sydney, Australia. Up until 2014 the club played in the New South Wales Suburban Rugby Union competition, but currently competes in the Central Coast competition.

History
The club was formed in 1962 when Sydney Rugby Union established a Second Division of the Sydney Grade Competition. That competition was absorbed into the New South Wales Suburban Rugby Union 'Subbies' competition in 1993 bringing Hornsby, Mosman, Drummoyne and UNSW with it. In their first year in the new competition Hornsby won the 1st Division Club Championship (Bruce Graham Shield) along with the 2nd Grade, 3rd Grade and Colts Premierships. Hornsby was relegated to Second Division in 1998 and to Third Division in 2012. Hornsby transferred to the Central Coast Rugby Union's competition for the 2015 season.

Club information
Club Name:  Hornsby Rugby Union Football Club
Nickname: The Lions, HRC
Founded: 1962
Home Ground: Waitara Oval
Club Colors: Red, Black & Gold

Honours
1st Grade : 1991 (Sydney 2nd Div)

2nd Grade : 1993 Burke Cup Premiers (Div 1), 1966 & 1984 (Sydney 2nd Div)

3rd Grade : 2009, 2000 and 1999 Blunt Cup Premiers (Div 2), 1993 Whiddon Cup Premiers (Div 1), 1985, 1991 and 1990 Premiers (Sydney 2nd Div)

4th Grade : 2006 and 1999 Richardson Cup Premiers (Div 2), 1992 Premiers (Sydney 2nd Div), 1971 Premiers (Sydney 2nd Div)

Colts - Under 21s : 2009 and 2007 Robertson Cup Premiers (Div 2), 1993 Barbour Cup Premiers (Div 1), 1991 Premiers (Sydney 2nd Div),
Colts - Under 21s 2nd Grade : 1987 Premiers (Sydney 2nd Div)

References

Sources 
 New South Wales Suburban Rugby Union. Annual Report 2004, 2005, 2006, 2007, 2008, 2009, 2010
 The game for the game itself: The History of sub-district rugby in Sydney / Thomas V. Hickie and Anthony T. Hughes
 Men in Scarlet: The History of the Balmain, Glebe & Drummoyne Rugby Clubs 1874-2004 / John Mulford

External links 
Hornsby Rugby Union Football Club website
NSW Subbies website

Rugby union teams in Sydney
Rugby clubs established in 1962
1962 establishments in Australia
Hornsby, New South Wales